Schwarzenbach may refer to:

Places

In Austria 
 Schwarzenbach, Lower Austria, in the Wiener Neustadt-Land district
 Schwarzenbach an der Pielach, in Lower Austria
 Schwarzenbach (Eppenstein), a part of Eppenstein in Styria
 Schwarzenbach (Sankt Veit), a part of Sankt Veit in Lower Austria
 Schwarzenbach (Opponitz), a part of in Opponitz in Lower Austria

In Germany 
 Schwarzenbach an der Saale, a town in the district of Hof, Bavaria
 Schwarzenbach, Upper Palatinate, a town in the district of Neustadt (Waldnaab), Bavaria
 Schwarzenbach am Wald, a town in the district of Hof in Bavaria
 Schwarzenbach (Lindlar), a part of Lindlar in the district of Oberbergischer Kreis in North Rhine-Westphalia

In Switzerland 
 Schwarzenbach, Lucerne, part of Beromünster in the Canton of Lucerne
 Schwarzenbach, Berne, a part of Huttwil in the Canton of Berne
 Schwarzenbach, St. Gallen, a part of Jonschwil in the Canton of St Gallen

Historical 
 Schwarzenbach, an older name of Černava in the Karlovy Vary Region, Czech Republic
 Schwarzenbach, an older name of Črna na Koroškem, a town in Slovenia

Rivers 
 Schwarzenbach (Obere Argen), a river in Baden-Württemberg, Germany
 Schwarzenbach (Weißach), a river in Bavaria, Germany
 Schwarzenbach (Rabnitz), a river in eastern Austria, tributary of the Danube

People with the surname
 Schwarzenbach (surname)

See also 
 Schwarzbach (disambiguation)

German-language surnames